Doué-en-Anjou (literally Doué in Anjou) is a commune in the Maine-et-Loire department of western France. The municipality was established on 30 December 2016 and consists of the former communes of Brigné, Concourson-sur-Layon, Doué-la-Fontaine, Forges, Meigné, Montfort, Saint-Georges-sur-Layon and Les Verchers-sur-Layon.

Population

See also 
Communes of the Maine-et-Loire department

References 

Communes of Maine-et-Loire
Anjou